Norion Spaho (born 11 June 1986) is an Albanian football player.

External links
 

1986 births
Living people
Albanian footballers
Association football defenders
KF Apolonia Fier players
Flamurtari Vlorë players
Kategoria Superiore players